John Thomas Ward (11 March 1937 – 12 January 2021) was a New Zealand cricketer who played as a wicket-keeper in eight Test matches between 1964 and 1968. Ward's Test captain John Reid said that he was "easily the best wicketkeeper in New Zealand in his time, but was plagued by injury."

Cricket career
Ward made his first-class debut for South Island against North Island in a trial match for the 1958 tour of England. He took five catches in the first innings, and was selected as Eric Petrie's deputy on the tour. He made his Plunket Shield debut for Canterbury in 1959–60, and was selected to tour South Africa in 1961-62, where he served as deputy to Artie Dick.

He finally made his Test debut in 1963–64 in the First Test against the South African touring team, but then lost his place to Dick, who was a superior batsman. He replaced Dick for the Third Test against Pakistan in New Zealand in 1964–65, and went on the tour of India and Pakistan in 1965 as the sole wicket-keeper. He made his highest Test score of 35 not out in the First Test against India, when he and Richard Collinge put on 61 for the last wicket, but injury forced him out after the Indian leg of the tour, and Dick again replaced him. Later that year, in England, Ward returned to the side, replacing Dick for the Third Test. His last Test was the Fourth Test against India in 1967-68.

Ward continued to play for Canterbury until the end of the 1970–71 season. He scored his only first-class fifty against Wellington in 1969-70 when, batting at number five, he made 54 not out. He represented South Canterbury in the Hawke Cup from 1960 to 1976.

His son Barry kept wicket for Canterbury in the 1986–87 season. Ward died in Timaru on 12 January 2021 after a short illness, aged 83.

References

External links
 

1937 births
2021 deaths
New Zealand Test cricketers
New Zealand cricketers
Canterbury cricketers
Cricketers from Timaru
South Island cricketers
Wicket-keepers